Resul Yazgeldiyevich Hojayev (7 January 1997) is a Turkmen professional footballer who plays as a midfielder for Turkmen club FC Ahal and the Turkmenistan national team.

He has won seven Turkmenistan Ýokary Liga titles.

Club career 
Resul Hojaýew started his career with FC Altyn Asyri in 2014.

In March 2021, FC Ahal announced the signing of Resul Hojaýew.

International career

Under-21
On 17 January 2015, Hojaýew made his debut with Turkmenistan U21 in a friendly match against Finland U21 after coming on as a substitute at 69th minute in place of Gurban Annayev.

Senior
In August 2017, Hojaýew received a call-up from Turkmenistan for the friendly match against Qatar and made his debut  after being named in the starting line-up and scored his side's only goal during a 2–1 away defeat.

On 27 December 2018, Hojaýew was named as part of the Turkmenistan squad for 2019 AFC Asian Cup. On 9 January 2019, he made his competitive debut with Turkmenistan in a match against Japan after being named in the starting line-up.

Career statistics

International

Honours

Club

Altyn Asyr
Ýokary Liga (7): 2014, 2015, 2016, 2017, 2018, 2019, 2020

References

External links 
 
 

1997 births
Living people
Turkmenistan footballers
Turkmenistan international footballers
2019 AFC Asian Cup players
People from Ahal Region
FC Altyn Asyr players
Association football midfielders